Jan Birkelund (10 November 1950 – 28 February 1983) was a Norwegian footballer.

Club career
A tall and strong central defender, at club level he played for Skeid and Lillestrøm. Birkelund won the Norwegian championship, the cup champion with Skeid in 1974, and won "The Double" with Lillestrøm in 1977. Lifting the Championship trophy in 1978 as well, the cup final turned out to be his last match. Shortly before the start of the 1979 season, Birkelund was diagnosed with a heart defect, and retired from football on the advice of his doctors. Four years later, Birkelund died as a result of cardiac arrest.

He played a total of 130 games in the First Division.

Internationals career
In addition, he was capped 33 times for Norway.

References

External links
 National team appearances

1950 births
1983 deaths
Footballers from Oslo
Norwegian footballers
Norway international footballers
Skeid Fotball players
Lillestrøm SK players
Eliteserien players
Association football central defenders